Tadasuni is a comune (municipality) in the Province of Oristano in the Italian region Sardinia, located about  north of Cagliari and about  northeast of Oristano.

Tadasuni borders the following municipalities: Ardauli, Boroneddu, Ghilarza, Sorradile.

Demographic evolution

References

External links

 www.comunetadasuni.it/

Cities and towns in Sardinia